Cylichna cylindracea is a species of gastropods belonging to the family Cylichnidae.

The species is found in America, Europe, Africa.
It is a predator of foraminiferans, Ammonia batavus and Globobulimina turgida

References

Cylichnidae
Molluscs described in 1777
Cephalaspidea